The Infamous Column (also known as Pillar of Shame) is a 1973 Italian historical drama film directed by Nelo Risi.

Plot 

It is 1630, and a devastating plague has descended upon the city of Milan. Guglielmo Piazza and Giacomo Mora are depicted as two city's artisans (really only Mora, a barber, was an artisan while Piazza was a sanity officer). One day a woman accuses Piazza of being an untore (i.e. a greaser): a spreader of disease by anointing walls and furnitures with a pestiferous ointment. According to a superstitious belief held by the people, these untori were in league with the Devil, and were responsible for the spread of the pestilence.

Immediately the Church and the Inquisition scapegoat the two artisans for the outbreak, and subject them to trial by torture, despite the protests of Cardinal Borromeo.

Innocent victims of a panic which has gripped the populace, Piazza and Mora are found guilty of the imaginary crime of smearing poisonous substances about in the city to induce plague. They are put to death upon the wheel. Afterwards, a pillar (The Infamous Column of the title) is erected in the square which beheld their execution, with a warning for the masses, to guard against eruptions of public hysteria ever again.

Cast 

Helmut Berger: Arconati
Vittorio Caprioli: Guglielmo Piazza
Francisco Rabal: Giacomo Mora
Lucia Bosé: Chiara 
Salvo Randone:  Settala
Sergio Tofano: President of the Senate
Pierluigi Aprà: Senator Monti
Annabella Incontrera: Lover of Arcomat
Feodor Chaliapin Jr.: Cardinal Federico  
Ernesto Colli: Judge
 Martin Balsam

See also      
 List of Italian films of 1972

References

External links

1972 films
Films based on works by Alessandro Manzoni
Films directed by Nelo Risi
Films about miscarriage of justice
Films about capital punishment
Italian historical drama films
1970s historical drama films
1972 drama films
1970s Italian films